Bashir (also Romanized as Bashīr and Beshīr) is a village in Mavazekhan-e Shomali Rural District, Khvajeh District, Heris County, East Azerbaijan Province, Iran. At the 2006 census, its population was 268, in 59 families.

References 

Populated places in Heris County